Doug Cockle is an American actor and director. He is currently working as a freelance actor.

Cockle is known for his voice-over roles in video games, most notably of Geralt of Rivia in The Witcher series. He was nominated for a Game Award for Best Performance and won Golden Joystick Award Best Gaming Performance for his portrayal of Geralt in The Witcher 3: Wild Hunt.

Filmography

Film

Television

Video games

References

External links 
 
 
 

21st-century American male actors
Living people
American emigrants to England
American male film actors
American male television actors
American male video game actors
American male voice actors
American expatriates in England
Academics of Arts University Bournemouth
Year of birth missing (living people)
Place of birth missing (living people)